The Grosvenor Challenge Cup, commonly known as the Grosvenor Cup, was a trophy presented by Lord Edward Grosvenor in 1923 to the winner of a light aircraft time trial competition. Entries were initially restricted to British designs using aero engines of less than 150 horsepower. The first competitions were held at Lympne Aerodrome in Kent. The contest continued until 1935 with a break to 1949 when the Royal Aero Club resumed the races at Elmdon where the entry was opened to British and international designs with a weight less than 1,000 kilograms.

For the 1949 event the contest had been briefly renamed to The Grosvenor Challenge Trophy Race, the 1950 event reverted to the former title.

Grosvenor
Lord Edward Grosvenor the former Royal Naval Air Service (RNAS) aviator and the youngest son of the Duke of Westminster presented the cup, his objective in offering the cup "is to give a chance to the low-power machine, one comparable to the average motor car, with a horse-power of say thirty or forty. I think this will prove the most suitable type for general use, as the really low-powered light aeroplane will not be large enough for general touring about the country."

1923
For the first handicap race in 1923 they were ten entrants for the first prize of a £100 and a second prize of £50, the winner was also allowed to keep the cup for a year. Only nine aircraft started the race and only five made it to the finishing line, the first to land was Walter Longton in the Sopwith Gnu. Lord Edward Grosvenor witnessed the start and the end of the race at Lympne and the cup was presented to the winner by Beatrice Grosvenor. During the race Major Ernest Leslie Foot died when his Bristol M.1 G-EAVP  aircraft crashed at Chertsey.

The only female entrant was Mrs Oliver Atkey (nee Dulcibella Evangeline Clifford (1894-1960)), in "a machine of D.H. type". The year before, her flight from Leeds to Edgeware was widely reported as the longest flight by a woman pilot in Britain.

1924
In 1924 the entry requirement was changed from an engine with no more than 150hp power to those a displacement no more than 1,100cc. Originally planned to be flown from Lympne to Manston twice this was later changed to a course closer to the airfield, the aircraft did eight circuits of the course to complete 100 miles. The race had eighteen entries.

1925
In 1925 the handicap race used the same eight circuit course around Lympne as in 1924 but the entry requirement was changed to aircraft with engines that weighed no more than 275lb. The race had twelve entries and was won by Flight Lieutenant J.S. Chick flying the RAE Hurricane.

Summary table
Sources: Flightglobal Archive and Dorman 1951.

See also
Gordon Bennett Trophy
King's Cup Race
Lympne light aircraft trials
Schneider Trophy

References
Notes

Bibliography
 Dorman, Geoffrey. Fifty Years Fly Past. London. Forbes Robertson Ltd. 1951 (No ISBN) 
 Lewis, Peter. British Racing and Record Breaking Aircraft. London: Putnam, 1971. .
 Flightglobal Archive - www.flightglobal.com

External links
 Flight, 28 June 1923 - Images of Lord Edward Grosvenor and the Grosvenor Challenge Cup

Air races
Aviation in the United Kingdom
Aviation competitions and awards